Kim Yun-ho (born January 12, 1990), known professionally as Shaun, is a South Korean singer-songwriter, music producer, and DJ. He debuted in 2010 as the keyboardist and backup singer of the indie rock band The Koxx. In July 2018, his solo song, "Way Back Home," unexpectedly topped South Korean music charts, drawing accusations that he and his management had manipulated chart rankings. His management company denied the accusations, as did Shaun himself. After investigation by the Ministry of Culture, Sports, and Tourism, these accusations were found false.

Discography

Extended plays

Remixes

Singles

Awards

Korean Popular Music Awards

Melon Music Awards

Golden Disc Awards

Notes

References

External links 
Official website

1990 births
Living people
21st-century South Korean  male singers
South Korean male singer-songwriters
South Korean DJs